Hoplunnis sicarius is an eel in the family Nettastomatidae (duckbill/witch eels). It was described by Samuel Garman in 1899, originally under the genus Atopichthys. It is a marine, tropical eel which is known from the eastern central Pacific Ocean, including Mazatlan, Mexico, and Panama. Unlike many eel species, it does not form burrows.

References

Nettastomatidae
Fish described in 1899